K17 may refer to:

 K-17 (Kansas highway), former
 HMS K17, a K-class submarine of the Royal Navy
 Kaman K-17, an American experimental helicopter
 Keratin 17
 Symphony No. 2 (Mozart), once attributed to Wolfgang Amadeus Mozart